Triodia froitzheimi is a species of moth belonging to the family Hepialidae. It was described by Franz Daniel in 1967 and is known from Jordan.

References

External links
Hepialidae genera

Hepialidae
Moths described in 1967